Timber Creek High School is a public high school located in Orlando, Florida, within the Orange County Public Schools system. Its primary mascot is a wolf, and its principal is Kelly Paduano.

History
Timber Creek High School was built in 2000 as a relief school for nearby University High School. John Wright, the founding principal, remained at Timber Creek until 2012 when he became the executive area director for the school system's East Learning Community.

Athletics
Timber Creek has won state championships in baseball (2017), bowling (2006, boys and girls), volleyball (2008 FHSAA), and cheerleading (2009, 2010, 2012 and 2013).

Robotics team
In addition to winning the 2015 Florida State Championship and competing in the World Championship, the VEX Robotics team has won the following awards:

 2016  Florida VRC State Championship: Tournament Champions
 2015 Florida VRC State Championship: Tournament Champions and Tournament Finalists
 2015 Battle in Brandon: Tournament Champions, Judges Award, Robot Skills Champion
 2015 Space Coast Vex Robotics Showdown: Excellence Award, Robot Skills Champion, Programming Skills Champion
 2014 Central Florida SKYRISE: Excellence Award, Innovate Award, Programming Skills Champion, Robot Skills Champion, Sportsmanship Award

Programming team
The programming team at Timber Creek High School competes in contests modeled after the ACM International Collegiate Programming Contest.   They attend contests at Stetson University, University of Central Florida, University of Florida, and Florida International University.    In addition, they are members of the Florida High School Programming Series, USA Computing Olympiad, and the American Computer Science League.   They also attend other online contests hosted by Codeforces, Topcoder, and CodeChef.

Academics
Timber Creek, like most high schools, offers many Advanced Placement (AP) classes.

The APC (AP Choice) program is an advanced placement program for freshmen and sophomores. The APC program puts its students in classes with other APC students, and moves these classes at a faster pace than normal honors classes. It is intended to prepare the students for the AP courses that they will take in the future by increasing rigor and moving at the faster pace than normal honors classes. The APC program also requires the enrollment in AP Human Geography freshmen year to give the students a taste of AP classes. At graduation, if the students that were in the APC program have taken at least 6 AP classes during their high school years, they receive a special sticker on their diploma that recognizes them as an AP scholar.

Band program
On November 15, 2003, in only their third year of existence (and at their first appearance at the Florida Marching Band Coalition (FMBC) Championships), the Timber Creek Regiment was crowned FMBC Overall Grand Champion at the FMBC State Finals, the first band other than Cypress Creek High School (Orlando FL) recognized as "State Champions".

In 2009, the Regiment also had an undefeated season with their show Within. The Regiment has won numerous awards, such as best brass, best woodwinds, best colorguard, best effect, best percussion, etc. 
On November 20, 2010, the Timber Creek Regiment's performance of X: The Journey garnered them recognition as Class 5A Champions at the 2010 FMBC Championships, held at Tropicana Field, St. Petersburg FL (as of the 2005 marching season, FMBC no longer designates a "Grand Champion" at state finals). They also won this title in 2012 with their show "Two Sides". Recently, they won the 2021 FMBC State Championship with their show The Hill We Climb, based on the Poem by Amanda Gorman.

Notable alumni
Grant Amato – murderer serving life imprisonment 
Chris Board – NFL linebacker for the Detroit Lions
Chase Stokes – actor
Lemuel Jeanpierre – assistant offensive line coach for the Miami Dolphins
Jeremy Pope – actor
Ryan Carpenter – professional ice hockey player
Jacques Patrick – XFL running back for the San Antonio Brahmas

References

External links
Timber Creek High School

Orange County Public Schools
High schools in Orange County, Florida
Schools in Orlando, Florida
Public high schools in Florida
School buildings completed in 2000
Educational institutions established in 2001
2001 establishments in Florida